The Hohaiyan Rock Festival is an annual Taiwan rock music festival held in Fulong Beach, Gongliao District, New Taipei, Taiwan.

Names
The name "Hohaiyan" came from the historical fact that Taiwan is an island surrounded by sea and waves. Taiwanese aborigines heard the wave sound coming to shore with a melody of "ho-hai-yan", thus "Hohaiyan" ever since has signified waves and oceans to them.

History
This free music event first started in 2000 on 15 July.

Performers

Taiwan
Notable musicians from Taiwan have performed in this concert, such as Mayday.

Outside Taiwan
Many from outside Taiwan have also performed, such as Baseball from Australia, Canada, Mainland China, Hong Kong, Japan, Nepal, Malaysia, Singapore, Switzerland, United States etc.

Transportation

The concert venue is accessible within walking distance from TRA Fulong Station.

See also
 Fulong Beach
 Music of Taiwan
 Culture of Taiwan
 List of music festivals in Taiwan

References

External links
 
 2011 Hohaiyan Rock Festival
 2013 Hohaiyan Rock Festival

2000 establishments in Taiwan
Annual events in Taiwan
Rock festivals in Taiwan
Tourist attractions in New Taipei